The dusky-footed elephant shrew or dusky-footed sengi (Elephantulus fuscipes) is a species of elephant shrew in the family Macroscelididae. It is found in Democratic Republic of the Congo, South Sudan, and Uganda. Its natural habitat is subtropical or tropical dry lowland grassland.

References

Elephant shrews
Mammals described in 1894
Taxa named by Oldfield Thomas
Taxonomy articles created by Polbot